Diwan Bahadur Cherubala Pathayapura Karunakara Menon (1891–1976) was an Indian civil servant and administrator who served as the Diwan of Cochin kingdom from 1944 to 1947. He was the last Diwan of the kingdom and served until its accession to the Indian Union.

Early life and education 

Karunakara Menon was born in 1891 in the town of Chittur in the then Cochin kingdom in a family of six. Menon had his schooling in Chittur and graduated from the Presidency College, Madras.

Career 

On completion of his education, Menon joined the Madras Board of Revenue as a clerk. When the first Indian National Congress government was formed in the Madras Presidency as per the Government of India Act 1935, Karunakara Menon was appointed Secretary in the Public Service Commission.

Menon was soon transferred as district collector of South Canara and to the Development Department as Secretary. When the Second World War broke out, Menon was appointed Regional Food Commissioner of the Government of India and then, transferred to Delhi to take over as Director-General of Food.

In 1944, Menon succeeded G. T. Boag as the Diwan of Cochin kingdom and served till 15 August 1947, when India obtained independence. He presided over the state's accession to the Republic of India.

Later life 

In his later life, Karunakara Menon served as an advisor to the Indian government and was instrumental in setting up the Chittur College. Karunakara Menon died in 1976 at the age of 85.

References 

 

1891 births
1976 deaths
Diwans of Cochin
Dewan Bahadurs